Macif is a maxi-trimaran launched in 2015.

History
Macif was designed by the naval architectural firm Van Peteghem Lauriot-Prévost with the assistance of GSea Design for calculation of the structure. The yacht is built for long distance sailing competitions and attempts at sailing records.

With the yacht, skipper François Gabart has won the Transat Jacques Vabre in 2015 (sailing dual-handed with Pascal Bidégorry) and The Transat in 2016. In 2017, a new around the world sailing record for circumnavigation of the world was set by François Gabart at 42 days, 16 hours, 40 minutes, and 35 seconds. During this record around the world singlehanded, François Gabart covered 850.68 miles in 24 hours.

References

Yachts
Trimarans